Celerina Staz railway station is a railway station in the municipality of Celerina, in the Swiss canton of Graubünden. It is located on the Bernina line of the Rhaetian Railway.

The station has a single through track and a single platform with a station building. There is a siding in the station.

Services
The following services stop at Celerina Staz:

References

External links
 
 

Railway stations in Switzerland opened in 1908
Railway stations in Graubünden
Rhaetian Railway stations
20th-century architecture in Switzerland